Sicaya may refer to:

 Sicaya, Bolivia, a town in the Cochabamba Department in Bolivia.
 Sicaya, Peru, a town in the Junín Region in Peru.
 Sicaya Canton, a canton in the Sicaya Municipality in Bolivia.
 Sicaya District, a district in the Huancayo Province in Peru.
 Sicaya Municipality a municipality in the Capinota Province in Bolivia.